Ken Parry (20 June 1930 – 5 December 2007), was an English actor, born in Wigan, Lancashire. Bald, portly and cherubic, Parry portrayed mainly comic character parts in a number of films, but was more prolific on television, in such series as The Army Game, The Avengers, The Baron, The Newcomers, Dixon of Dock Green, Nearest and Dearest, Love Thy Neighbour, Z-Cars, The Sweeney, Coronation Street, Hazell and Children's Ward.

Selected filmography
 Friends and Neighbours (1959) - Sid
 Just For Fun (1963) - Lift Attendant
 The Liquidator (1965) - Tailor (uncredited)
 Out of the Unknown ('Time in Advance', episode) (1965) - Ballaskia
 The Brides of Fu Manchu (1966) - Hospital Receptionist (uncredited)
 The Taming of the Shrew (1967) - Tailor
 Otley (1968) - 3rd Businessman
 Start the Revolution Without Me (1970) - Dr. Boileau
 Spring and Port Wine (1970) - Pawnbroker
 Burke & Hare (1972) - Fat Man in Brothel
 That's Your Funeral (1972) - Railway Porter
 Bequest to the Nation (1973) - Victory's Cook (uncredited)
 Mistress Pamela (1974) - Parson
 Lisztomania (1975) - Rossini
 Joseph Andrews (1977) - Mr. Wilson's Companion
 Come Play with Me (1977) - Podsnap
 What's Up Nurse! (1978) - 1st Gay Young Man
 Hawk the Slayer (1980) - Thomas
 Lifeforce (1985) - Sykes (serial killer)
 The Rainbow Thief (1990) - Snow

References

External links

1930 births
2007 deaths
People from Wigan
British male stage actors
British male film actors
British male television actors